Ithkuil is an experimental constructed language created by John Quijada. It is designed to express more profound levels of human cognition briefly yet overtly and clearly, particularly about human categorization. It is a cross between an a priori philosophical and a logical language. It tries to minimize the vagueness and semantic ambiguity in natural human languages. Ithkuil is notable for its grammatical complexity and extensive phoneme inventory, the latter being simplified in an upcoming redesign. The name "Ithkuil" is an anglicized form of Iţkuîl, which in the original form roughly meant "hypothetical representation of a language." Quijada states he did not create Ithkuil to be auxiliary or used in everyday conversations. Instead, he wanted the language for more elaborate and profound fields where more insightful thoughts are expected, such as philosophy, arts, science, and politics.

Meaningful phrases or sentences can usually be expressed in Ithkuil with fewer linguistic units than natural languages. For example, the two-word Ithkuil sentence "Tram-mļöi hhâsmařpţuktôx" can be translated into English as "On the contrary, I think it may turn out that this rugged mountain range trails off at some point." Quijada deems his creation as too complex to have developed naturally, seeing it as an exercise in exploring how languages could function. No person, even Quijada himself, is known to speak Ithkuil fluently. Nevertheless, it was featured in the Language Creation Conference's 6th Conlang Relay.

Four versions of the language have been publicized: the initial version in 2004, a simplified version called Ilaksh in 2007, a third version in 2011, and the current version (as of February 2023), called New Ithkuil. In 2004—and again in 2009 with Ilaksh—Ithkuil was featured in the Russian-language popular science and IT magazine Computerra. In 2008, David J. Peterson awarded it the Smiley Award. In 2013, Bartłomiej Kamiński codified the language to parse complicated sentences quickly. Julien Tavernier and anonymous others have since followed suit. Since July 2015, Quijada has released several Ithkuil songs in a prog-rock style as part of the album Kaduatán, which translates to "Wayfarers." Recently, online communities have developed in English, Russian, Mandarin, and Japanese.

History

Influences
Ithkuil evolved over 45 years as a linguistic experiment beyond Western Indo-European languages in response to the Sapir-Whorf hypothesis and Charles J. Fillmore’s case grammar into "a complex, intricate array of interwoven grammatical concepts" with "ideas inspired by countless hours studying texts in theoretical linguistics, cognitive grammar, psycholinguistics, language acquisition, linguistic relativity, semantics, semiotics, philosophy, fuzzy set theory, and even quantum physics." Ithkuil was heavily inspired by cognitive linguists including George Lakoff, Ronald Langacker, Gilles Fauconnier, and Len Talmy.

For his influences, Quijada cites the obscure "morphophonology of Abkhaz verb complexes, the moods of verbs of certain American Indian languages, the aspectual system of Niger–Kordofanian languages, the nominal case systems of Basque and Dagestanian languages, the enclitic system of the Wakashan languages, the positional orientation systems of Tzeltal and Guugu Yimithirr, the Semitic triliteral root morphology, and the hearsay and possessive categories of Suzette Elgin's Láadan language". The writing system's logical design borrows principles from Ethiopic and Brahmi scripts, but employs a unique morphophonemic principle. The script used throughout the Ithkuil grammar bears a superficial resemblance to Hebrew square script and the various Klingon fonts. Furthermore, Ilaksh had a "cartouche script" and a cursive format (the former of which had been an upcoming aesthetic project of the designer's).

Ilaksh (2007) 
The initial publication of Ithkuil in 2004 had an extensive phonology of 65 consonants and 17 vowels. After a mention of Ithkuil in the Russian magazine Computerra, several speakers of Russian contacted Quijada and expressed enthusiasm to learn Ithkuil for its application to psychonetics, with several complaining about its difficulty in pronunciation. Quijada remade Ithkuil's morphophonology with 30 consonants and 10 vowels (and the addition of tones) and published the revision on 10 June 2007 as Ilaksh. The language featured other amendments to grammar, including some additional Levels and a change of Cases. It was redesigned to be easier to speak and included an additional writing system. The initial sequential "informal" system suitable for handwriting or compact typesetting, and a "formal" logographic system with artistic possibilities resembling Maya scripts.

In the "informal" writing system, several parallel sets of lines are shaped to correspond sequentially to the different parallel sets of lexemes and inflections. It is directly pronounceable. The author designed it with reserve for convenient handwriting. The overall design would permit compact, clear, black-and-white rendering.

In the colorful "formal" script, a single complex glyph represented an entire sentence. Diversely shaped, shaded and superimposed cartouches represent the syntactic relations of the verb and noun phrases of a sentence. The edges of the cartouches had particular shapes that indicate one set of inflections, the colors indicate another set of inflections, and the textures yet another one. On the cartouches, letters of hexagonal outline would spell out the forms of particular lexemes. The cartouches formed phrases, with primary phrases overlapping subordinate phrases. The coloring system utilized different color densities and texturing for different colors in order to be usable by colorblind people. These density conventions also allowed the formal system to be inexpensively printed in black-and-white, or inscribed or imprinted on stone or other materials.

Ithkuil (2011) 
Ilaksh was superseded by a morphologically similar language also termed Ithkuil because of its ties to the initial publication. The script uses a unique morphophonemic principle that allows sentences representing grammatical categories to be pronounced in multiple ways as the speaker sees fit. It was deemed the final version of the language, which grew attention to conlangers on social media. One blog translates "I am sleepy because those damn cats were fighting all night and I couldn’t sleep well!" as ur-rn aičnattîbi tei n-nrai’dáčnuitîb ti wëqam-msukšš hwaičúitôkçuxh rrolp żü’âluss.

In 2014 the category of register was introduced and in 2015 a mathematical and measurement-based sublanguage was published. Dozens on the community Reddit forum have proposed revisions to make the language more learnable. Quijada plans to adopt the cartouche script "for use as an alternative, 'ornamental' writing system for artistic purposes" to Ithkuil in a future update of the language.

New Ithkuil (2023) 
Owing to complaints about the difficult patterns in the language morphology, on 30 October 2017 Quijada published a tentative outline for a new version of the language, addressing learners' desires for a more agglutinative morphophonology, including a restructured formative outline, and extended use of Adjuncts for shortened expression of the grammar to further create phonaesthetics. Quijada has considered mandating verbal categories expressed in formatives to be redundantly spoken aloud in adjuncts to be more naturalistic. Despite the complexity of the language, intended only as an experiment without concern for the constraints of human learnability, he has published several updates for a new language predicated off the original grammar, most recently in November 2019. The new language is intended to feature an expanded lexicon and writing system that can be handwritten.

In February 2023, Quijada published the fourth iteration of the language, titled New Ithkuil, and announced that the previous version would remain online for archival purposes.

Outline

Phonology 
The phonology consists of 32 consonants and 9 vowels. The consonants are as follows:

The consonants c’, č’, k’, p’, q, qʰ, q’, t’, and xh are eliminated, x is pronounced , ň will be written as n before k, g, or x, and dh is now written as ḑ (or optionally đ or ḍ). The clusters with h are disyllabic in word-medial positions, but usually form allophones when found at the beginning of words. For example, word-medially kh would be pronounced [kh] as in the English word "backhanded", but kh is pronounced [kʰ] in the New Ithkuil word "khala". The forms hl, hr, hm, and hn can be pronounced either as [ɬ], [ɾ̥], [m̥], and [n̥] respectively, or as separate consonants. Combinations of a voiced consonant plus following -h- are always dissyllabic. r is pronounced as a tap [ɾ], but becomes a trill [r] when geminated. Following another consonant, a non-geminated r may optionally be pronounced as an apico-alveolar-retroflex approximant [ɹ]. When ř is geminated it is either [ʁ:] or can be strengthened to a uvular trill [ʀ].

The vowels are as follows:

The vowels ê, î, ô, and û are removed from 2011 Ithkuil to allow for easier memorization. Rules for external junction between words have been described for speakers to be able to clearly parse word boundaries.

Stress is marked with an acute diacritic on letters without diacritics and the circumflex on letters with a diaeresis. The letters i and u are marked with a grave diacritic when they are unstressed and the first of more than one vowel after a consonant to remind the reader that they are pronounced [iː] and [u] and not [j] nor [w], respectively.

Grammar 
The grammar is largely the same as in Ithkuil 2011, but with a greater focus on the scope of grammatical categories to be more logical. Stem pattern has been replaced by stem specification, and Suffixes were renamed Affixes. The categories of Designation, Sanction, and Modality have been supplanted by affixual forms. Possessive cases are named Appositive; Associative cases split into Associative, Adverbial, Relational, and Affinitive; and Comparative cases are eliminated. The Ca complex is modular and various categories follow a 9-valued vowel sequence. Incorporated roots have been replaced by a system of concatenation. Formatives and personal reference categories now have the option to carry Effect, a category prescribing beneficial, detrimental, or neutral states to a referent.

Lexicon 
The lexicon includes over 6000 roots and 600 affixes.

Possible advantages 
The Sapir–Whorf hypothesis postulates that a person's language influences their perceptions and cognitive patterns. Stanislav Kozlovsky proposed in the Russian popular-scientific magazine Computerra that a fluent speaker of Ithkuil, accordingly, would think "about five or six times as fast" as a speaker of a typical natural language. The Sapir–Whorf hypothesis would suggest that, Ithkuil being an extremely precise and synthetic language, its speakers would have a more discerning, deeper understanding both of everyday situations and of broader phenomena, and of abstract philosophical categories.

However, strong forms of the hypothesis, which postulate that language determines thought and not only influences it, have been rejected by mainstream linguistics. Moreover, in line with this, Quijada has stated he does not believe a speaker would think necessarily any faster because even though Ithkuil is terse, a single word requires a lot more thought before it can be spoken than it would in a natural language.

Kozlovsky also likened Ithkuil to the fictional Speedtalk from Robert A. Heinlein's novella Gulf, and contrasted both languages with the Newspeak of the communicationally restricted society of Orwell's Nineteen Eighty-Four. Ithkuil is by far the most complete language of the three, as the lexicon and grammar are described in far greater detail. John Quijada acknowledged the similarity of Ithkuil's design goals to those of Speedtalk, remarking that,

Past versions

Ithkuil (2004)
The original version of Ithkuil had a significantly more complicated morphophonology.

Phonology 

At the left of each cell in the table below is the phoneme, and at the right its transliterated representation. The original 65 consonants were as follows:

All consonants except y and w could be geminated; when geminated, h was a bidental fricative and r was an alveolar trill.

At the left of each cell in the table below is the phoneme, and at the right its transliterated representation. The original 17 vowels are as follows:

All other sequences of vowels were pronounced as separate syllables.

Grammar 
The lexicon of the original Ithkuil consisted of the same patterns as the 2011 form of the language. However, each root consisted of 2 consonantal radicals, and could derive thousands of lexemes through the use of Ithkuil's complex rules of morphophonology, which involved both consonantal and vocal mutation, shifts in syllabic stress and tone, and affixation.

Ithkuil words can be divided into just two parts of speech, formatives and adjuncts. Formatives functioned both as nouns and as verbs, depending on the morphosemantic context. Formatives were inflected for the current grammatical categories, plus 2 foci, and 81 cases; they could also have taken on some of the 153 affixes, which further qualified into one of 9 degrees. Verbal formatives were additionally inflected for 7 conflations.

Verbal adjuncts similarly worked in conjunction with adjacent formatives to provide additional grammatical information. Two types of verbal adjuncts were inflected to indicate 14 valencies, 6 versions, 8 formats, 37 derivations, 30 modalities, 4 levels, 9 validations, 9 phases, 9 sanctions, 32 aspects, 8 moods, and 24 biases.

An example of morphological analysis
(based entirely on the original Ithkuil grammar book)

The word iţkuîl was a formative derived from the root k-l (broadly concerning "speech", "voice", or even "interpretation") through the addition of several morphological determinants:
 The -u- vocalic infix
kul was the holistic variety of the Stem 2 of the three other possible stems from k-l. Translating roughly as "a meaningful unit of speech", i.e. "a word", it gave no emphasis on the meaning or the vocal rendering of the word.
 The u → uî mutation of the infix
Secondary mode, as opposed to primary mode, meant that the word kuîl is not to refer to a real-life phenomenon, but rather to a mental representation, or projection, of that phenomenon; to an imaginary or hypothetical object. Thus translating as, "a made-up word".
 A grade 8 mutation of the first radical consonant: k → ţk
The configuration of the term was composite. Roughly corresponding to the plurality concept in Indo-European languages, it also implies the objects in question (words, kuîl) to be diverse, while forming a "coherent emergent entity" (rather than just a collection or an array of different words), thus meaning "a vocabulary" or "lexicon".
 The i- vocalic prefix, one of the 24 possible for formative roots
The extension was delimitive, perceiving "vocabulary" as entire, with clearly distinguished boundaries, as opposed to it being just a local manifestationsuch as slang or a dialectof a broader lexicon (-ţkuîl).
The affiliation of the set of objects in question was coalescent. This indicates that the individual members of the set act together toward a higher purpose by coordinating their complementary functions. Thus, "a vocabulary/lexicon" becomes "a language".
 Syllabic stress on the penultimate syllable (-u-)
The perspective of the noun is monadic, seeing "the language" as a single and specific entity, rather than a collection of many languages existing separately, the general phenomenon ("human languages") or the abstract idea of language.
Thus, the approximate translation of iţkuîl was "an idea/fantasy of a complete purposeful system of complementary speech elements", or simply "an imaginary language".

Ilaksh (2007) 
In an effort to make the language more speakable, Quijada created a revision called Ilaksh that relied on tone to reduce the phonemic inventory.

The phonological system of Ilaksh was revised to consist of only 30 consonants and 10 vowels. The consonants are the same as those of Ithkuil IV with the omission of the voiceless alveolar lateral fricative . /m n̪ ŋ l ɽ/ could be syllabic. All consonants except /j w ʔ/ could be geminated; when geminated, h was a bidental fricative or a voiceless pharyngeal fricative, and ɽ was an alveolar trill. The clusters /n̪j/, /tj/, /dj/, and /lj/ could be pronounced as such or as the palatals [ɲ], [c], [ɟ], and [ʎ]. The orthography used /đ ŧ ż/ instead of /ḑ ţ ẓ/.

The vowels were the same as those of Ithkuil IV. All other sequences of vowels were pronounced as separate syllables.

Ithkuil (2011)

Phonology 
Ithkuil has 45 consonants and 13 vowels. At the left of each cell in the table below is the phoneme, and at the right its transliterated representation if it is not written the same in IPA as in romanized Ithkuil. The consonants are as follows:

 can be syllabic.

The 13 vowels of Ithkuil are as follows:

 are pronounced as  when they precede another vowel, and at the end of a word.  are pronounced  when they precede another vowel, except .

All other sequences of vowels are pronounced as separate syllables. The grave accent is used to indicate the vowel sequence is not a diphthong. The grave and acute accents are used for stress. In a future revision of the language, circumflex accents will be used for stress, but grave accents will not be used for stress, and will only be used to indicate the vowel sequence is not a diphthong so that the rules for marking stress are simplified.

Morphophonology 
Ithkuil words can be divided into just two parts of speech, Formatives and Adjuncts. Formatives can function both as nouns and as verbs, derived from the root and depending on the morphosemantic context. They can be expanded through various ‘suffixes’. Adjuncts serve two roles, either indicating personal referents like pronouns, or specifying additional verbal information such as grammatical bias. In a future version of the language, adjuncts will be able to convey suffix (or rather, affix) information.

Formatives

Roots are Ithkuil's most basic semantic units. All Ithkuil formatives are derived from a limited number of roots. Each root consists of a cluster of 1–4 consonants (five-consonant clusters are also available, but remain without an assigned meaning). The current lexicon of Ithkuil can potentially consist of approximately 3,600 word roots, just over 1000 of which have been assigned definitions. From the root, word stems are formed by affixing the vocalic affix that indicates stem pattern, stem type, function for the stem, and by stressing a particular syllable to indicate informal or formal designation.

There are three stems associated with each root. Each stem comes in three patterns, one holistic and two complementary ones. Holistic stem 1 typically refers to the most general manifestation of a root, whereas holistic stems 2 and 3 typically refer to more specific manifestations associated with the root. Each holistic stem has two complementary stems associated with it, which refer to the complementary concepts related to the holistic stem. The specific meaning of complementary stems depends somewhat on the root. These are derived from the word roots by prefixing a vowel or diphthong that also indicates the grammatical category function. Two examples are given in the tables below:

Basic morphology
All Ithkuil formatives, whether functioning as nouns or verbs, inflect for various grammatical categories that are quite dissimilar from any of those in natural languages. Quantization is more or less covered by the grammatical categories of Configuration, Affiliation, and Perspective, even though these do not technically refer to number per se.

Configuration 
The nine configurations (Uniplex, Duplex, Discrete, Aggregative, Segmentative, Componential, Coherent, Composite, Multiform) describe the physical similarity and relationship between the members of a set, e.g. trees may occur in a collection of the same species, of different species, or even in a patternless collection with plants that are not trees.

Affiliation 
The four affiliations (Consolidative, Associative, Variative, Coalescent) describe the subjective purpose or function of members of a set, e.g. a group of trees may occur naturally and have no purpose, they may have the same purpose, complementary purposes, or different purposes.

Perspective 
The four perspectives (Monadic, Unbounded, Nomic, Abstract) describe the boundedness of a set, i.e. if it is viewed as a single unit, multiple disconnected units, viewed generically, or its characteristics considered abstractly.

Extension 
The six extensions (Delimitive, Proximal, Inceptive, Terminative, Graduative, Depletive) describe the referred part of a set, e.g. its beginning or its end.

Essence 
The two essences (Normal, Representative) describe whether the referred set is in the real world or exists solely psychologically.

Context 
The four contexts (Existential, Functional, Representational, Amalgamate) describe the psychological relevance of the set, e.g. merely its existence or the set as symbolic for something else.

Designation 
The two designations (Informal, Formal) describe the authority or permanence of a set.

Version 
The six versions (Processual, Completive, Ineffectual, Incompletive, Positive, Effective) describe whether the action is goal-oriented or not, and whether the action is successfully completed.

Register 
The five registers (Narrative, Discursive, Parenthetical, Cogitant, Impressionistic) describe the mode of personal communication (narration, personal cogitation, subjective impression, direct speech, parenthetical “aside”).

Cases
There are 96 grammatical cases in Ithkuil, one special case being the Vocative, used for direct address. Verbal formatives inflect for case under Frame constructions (i.e., dependent clauses). The grammatical cases of Ithkuil can be divided into several distinct groups:

Verbal morphology
Several distinct grammatical categories apply only to verbal formatives. These are listed below:

Function 
The four functions describe the general relationship that the verbal formative has with its nominal participants (state, action, description). Ithkuil nominal formatives also carry a function, but cannot be inflected for them, always remaining in the "stative".

Mood 
The eight moods describe attitudes or perspectives on the act or the degree of factuality.

Illocution 
The six illocutions describe the general purpose of the speech act (assertion, question, warning, demand, etc.).

Relation 
The two relations describe whether the verbal formative is part of a subordinate clause.

Phase 
The nine phases describe the temporal pattern of the act or occurrence.

Sanction 
The nine sanctions describe the sort of truthfulness the listener should ascribe to it (assertion, allegation, counterargument, refutation, etc.).

Valence 
The fourteen valences describe the manner of participation of two separate entities to the verbal formative.

Validation 
The six validations describe the evidence supporting the statement.

Aspect 
The 32 aspects describe the temporal relationship of the verbal formative in its context.

Bias 
The 24 biases describe the speaker's emotional attitude towards the action.

Suffixes

Ithkuil uses a variety of affixes, termed suffixes, to further delineate what is described by the formative. They come in three types and often correlate with adverbs.

Adjuncts
There are two types of adjuncts in Ithkuil: personal-reference adjuncts and verbal adjuncts. All adjuncts are highly synthetic.

Personal reference adjuncts are akin to pronouns in English. There are two types of personal-reference adjuncts in Ithkuil: Single-referent and dual-referent.

Verbal adjuncts are adjuncts that work in conjunction with verbal formatives to provide information about the latter's Valence, Level, Phase, Sanction, Illocution, Modality, Aspect, and Bias. Of these, Modality and Level can only be indicated using verbal adjuncts, whereas the others can also be expressed on the verbal formative.

Numerical system 
Ithkuil uses a base 100 numeral system with roots for the numbers 1 to 10, and a stem-specific derivative suffix used with a number root to add a multiple of 10, providing the numerals up to 99. Ithkuil did not originally use the concept of zero. Numbers greater than 100 are expressed through multiple formatives, and a special numerical script has logograms for the numbers 1 to 100 and exponential powers of 100. On 27 March 2015, Quijada released a mathematical sublanguage using a dozenal number system which uses the circle constant tau.

Orthography 

Ithkuil uses a morphophonemic script because characters convey both phonetic and morphological information. (Notably, it has no alphabet as such.) Its use is closely tied to Ithkuil's grammatical system, which allows much of the phonological aspect of words to be morpho-syntactically inferred. Those parts of an Ithkuil word whose pronunciation is predictable are not written, whereas the characters used to indicate the pronunciation of the unpredictable parts of a word also convey the grammatical information necessary to reconstruct the implicit phonetics. Words are thus written in a highly abbreviated manner, particularly useful for the highly inflected, occasionally elongated words of the Ithkuil language. The script is also used alphabetically for transliterating foreign words and mathematical expressions.

References

External links
 
 
 Community on Reddit devoted to the Ithkuil language
 Information site (Russian)
 Chinese Translation

Engineered languages
Fusional languages
Constructed languages introduced in the 2000s
Grammatical cases
2004 introductions
Constructed languages